Nive River may refer to:
Nive River, France, a tributary of the Andour River
Nive River (Queensland), Australia, a tributary of the Warrego River
Nive River (Tasmania), Australia, a tributary of the River Derwent